Ignacio Zaragoza   is a city and seat of the municipality of Ignacio Zaragoza, in the northern Mexican state of Chihuahua. As of 2010, the town of Ignacio Zaragoza had a population of 3,518, up from 3,190 as of 2005.

References

Populated places in Chihuahua (state)